"Investigations" is the 36th episode of the American science fiction television series Star Trek: Voyager which aired on the UPN network.  It is the 20th episode of the second season.

Set in the 24th century, the series follows the adventures of the Federation starship Voyager during its journey home to Earth, having been stranded tens of thousands of light-years away. The episode centers around the character Neelix, who while investigating for a report shared on his new daily broadcast to the crew, stumbles upon a traitor who is sending coded messages to the Kazon. A comic subplot involves the Doctor's attempts at getting his medical segments included in Neelix's daily broadcast.

The episode aired on UPN on March 13, 1996.

Plot
Morale Officer Neelix starts a ship-wide information broadcast aboard Voyager as an attempt to raise crew-morale. However, his initial reports are somewhat downbeat as he shares the news that helmsman Tom Paris (whose conduct has become increasingly erratic through several preceding episodes) is to leave the ship permanently to join a Talaxian convoy.

It emerges that someone on board Voyager has been sending information to an enemy-race, the Kazon. After Seska and the Kazon abduct Tom Paris from the Talaxian ship, Neelix suggests on his broadcast that it was Paris who had betrayed them all. Captain Janeway privately reveals to Neelix that Paris's insubordination, departure and joining the Kazon was all part of an act to flush out a suspected traitor on board. Commander Chakotay had not been told as it was suspected that the traitor was from the Maquis, a deception that he indicates he is very disappointed by. She asks Neelix to use his new journalistic role to investigate.

Neelix eventually discovers that the real traitor is Michael Jonas, a Maquis engineer. Jonas locks down Engineering, injures Neelix, and attempts to draw Voyager into a trap laid by Kazon forces. Neelix recovers and attacks Jonas, who falls over a second-floor railing and is disintegrated by plasma leakage below. Tom Paris returns after damaging the Kazon ship and stealing a shuttle. He explains and apologizes to the crew for his recent behavior, revealing that it was a ruse that he and the captain had planned to infiltrate the Kazon and flush out the intruder many weeks ago.

Royal appearance
The then-Prince Abdullah, now King Abdullah II of Jordan, a fan of the show, appears as a non-speaking character. He is glimpsed in the first few minutes - in the cold opening (teaser) - playing an unnamed science officer standing before Ensign Harry Kim during the apparent tail-end of a conversation just before Neelix arrives to speak with Kim.

References

External links
 

Star Trek: Voyager (season 2) episodes
1996 American television episodes
Television episodes directed by Les Landau